Sebastiania pubiflora is a species of flowering plant in the family Euphorbiaceae. It was described in 1975. It is native to Guatemala.

References

pubiflora
Plants described in 1975
Flora of Guatemala